The 2019 Kanagawa gubernatorial election was held on 7 April 2019 to elect the next governor of Kanagawa. Incumbent Governor Yūji Kuroiwa was re-elected for a third term, defeating Makiko Kishi with 76.28% of the vote.

Candidates 
Yūji Kuroiwa back by LDP, Komeito, DPFP.
Makiko Kishi, back by the JCP and SDP.
The CDP decided to not supported the incumbent.

Results

References 

2019 elections in Japan
Gubernatorial elections in Japan
Politics of Kanagawa Prefecture